Lasha Kasradze (born 28 July 1989) is a Georgian professional footballer who plays as a defender for Torpedo Kutaisi.

Career
Kasradze's career got underway in 2010 with WIT Georgia, making his debut in the club's penultimate fixture of the 2009–10 Umaglesi Liga season against Baia. He netted his first goal in December 2010 during a Georgian Cup victory over Tskhinvali. In total, Kasradze remained for five campaigns and made one hundred and twenty-four appearances in all competitions; scoring seven times. AZAL of the Azerbaijan Premier League completed the signing of Kasradze in 2014. He would score twice, versus Sumgayit and Neftchala, in forty-nine appearances over two seasons. 2015 saw Kasradze join fellow Azerbaijan club Inter Baku.

Twenty appearances followed in 2015–16 as Inter Baku finished fourth. Kasradze made a return to Georgian football in June 2016 by agreeing to join Sioni Bolnisi. A year later, Samtredia became Kasradze's fifth club. He featured thirty-six times and netted once in his sole season with them. In 2018, Kasradze joined Kazakhstan Premier League side Zhetysu. He made his professional debut on 11 March during a loss to Tobol. Kasradze left Zhetysu at the end of 2018, subsequently moving across the country to newly-promoted top-flight team Taraz. He returned to Georgia after eighteen matches, signing with Torpedo Kutaisi in early 2020.

Kasradze's first and last match for Torpedo Kutaisi came against Dila Gori, with the latter winning both matches. He terminated his contract in September 2020. However, in October, the defender rejoined Torpedo Kutaisi on a contract until the succeeding December. Kasradze scored on his first appearance back with the club, netting a stoppage time winner versus Merani Tbilisi on 17 October.

Career statistics
.

Honours
Samtredia
Georgian Super Cup: 2017

References

External links

1989 births
Living people
Footballers from Tbilisi
Footballers from Georgia (country)
FC WIT Georgia players
AZAL PFK players
Shamakhi FK players
FC Sioni Bolnisi players
FC Samtredia players
FC Zhetysu players
FC Taraz players
FC Torpedo Kutaisi players
Erovnuli Liga players
Azerbaijan Premier League players
Kazakhstan Premier League players
Expatriate footballers from Georgia (country)
Expatriate footballers in Azerbaijan
Expatriate footballers in Kazakhstan
Expatriate sportspeople from Georgia (country) in Azerbaijan
Expatriate sportspeople from Georgia (country) in Kazakhstan
Association football defenders